Asserus or Asseros, also known as Assorus or Assoros (Ἄσσορος), was a town of Mygdonia in ancient Macedonia.

The site of Asserus is tentatively located near modern Assiros.

References

Populated places in ancient Macedonia
Former populated places in Greece
Geography of ancient Mygdonia